OEF may refer to:
Obscene Extreme Festival, an annual music festival in the Czech Republic since 1999
Operation Enduring Freedom, official U.S. government name for "the Global War on Terrorism" 2001–2014
Order of Ecumenical Franciscans, a religious sub-order of the Franciscans 
Oxygen Extraction Fraction, a measure of oxygen utilization efficiency